The 2019 Danish Cup final was played on 17 May 2019 between FC Midtjylland and Brøndby IF at Parken Stadium, Copenhagen, a neutral ground. The final is the culmination of the 2018–19 Danish Cup, the 65th season of the Danish Cup.

Brøndby IF appeared in their 10th Danish Cup final (third consecutive) and were the defending title-holders. FC Midtjylland had never won a Danish Cup title before the match, being four times the runners-up. The winner of the final earned themselves a place in at least the second qualifying round of the 2019–20 UEFA Europa League.

FC Midtjylland won the final after a penalty shoot-out and earned their first ever Danish Cup title.

Teams

Venue
All Cup Finals except the 1991 final (Odense Stadium) and 1992 final (Aarhus Idrætspark) have been played in the Copenhagen Sports Park (1955–1990), or Parken Stadium (1993–present)

Background
Brøndby is competing in its third consecutive final, losing to F.C. Copenhagen in 2017 and capturing the title over Silkeborg IF in 2018. FC Midtjylland is appearing in its fifth final, losing all four if its previous appearances. The two teams have previously met in the 2003 and 2005 finals, and the teams share an equal 1-1-1 record during the regular season of the 2018–19 Danish Superliga.

Route to the final

Note: In all results below, the score of the finalist is given first (H: home; A: away).

Match

Details
</onlyinclude>

References

Danish Cup Final
Danish Cup Final 2019
Danish Cup Final 2019
Danish Cup Finals
Danish Cup Final
Sports competitions in Copenhagen
Danish Cup Final 2019